George Cruickshank may refer to:

 George Cruikshank (1792–1878), British caricaturist and book illustrator
 George Cruickshank (Australian politician) (1853–1904), Australian politician
 George Cruikshank (editor) (1857–1936), American newspaper editor
 George Edward Cruickshank (1877–1962), Alberta politician
 George Cruickshank (bishop) (1881–1951), seventh Bishop of Waiapu
 George Cruickshank (Canadian politician) (1897–1970), Canadian politician